Great Wyrley  is a large village and civil parish in Staffordshire, England. It is coterminous with the villages of Landywood and Cheslyn Hay in the South Staffordshire district. It lies 5.5 miles north of Walsall, West Midlands. It had a population of 11,060 at the 2011 census.

History

Etymology
The word "Wyrley" derives from two Old English words: wir and leah. Wir meant "bog myrtle" and leah meant "woodland clearing", suggesting that Great Wyrley began as sparse woodland or marshland. "Great" refers to its dominant size over Little Wyrley.

Early history
Great Wyrley is mentioned in the Domesday Book under the name of Wereleia, and as early as 1086 is said to have been indirectly owned by the Bishop of Chester St John's as part of the "somewhat scattered holdings" of the Church of Saint Chad in Lichfield. Some 480 acres of farming land were, assumingly, evenly distributed between Wyrley and nearby Norton Canes. However, all six dependencies of Saint Chad had been labelled as "wasta", which meant they had been abandoned by the time the Domesday Book was made.

Lord of the manor
Manorialism continued for a long period and the current holder of the rights to the feudal title of Great Wyrley Manor is Anthony Henry Lord Great Wyrley, the freeholder of Great Wyrley and Essington Estates, Red Lane Essington, South Staffordshire, having acquired the title deeds from Elizabeth Sutherland, 24th Countess of Sutherland in 1989. There is considerable documentation (dating from 1397) relating to this very large manor in terms of land currently in the safekeeping of Staffordshire libraries.

Post-Industrial Revolution
In former times the village was a mining village — The Great Wyrley Colliery — with metalworking (such as for nails, agricultural implements and horseshoes) in outlying areas. The Wyrley and Essington Canal passes nearby.

In 1848 Samuel Lewis included the settlement in his gazetteer and stated it had: 
799 inhabitants and 1600 acres, of which the Duke of Sutherland owned part;
Several collieries;
The road from Walsall to Cannock passing through the village, long, and consisting of detached houses;
In 1844, Great Wyrley it formed with Cheslyn Hay a new ecclesiastical district, having a population of 1,753; 
St. Mark's Church, a highly finished structure in the early English style, built 1845, at a cost of £2,430, of which sum £1,200 was given by the Rev. William Gresley, prebendary of Lichfield; the remainder was raised by subscription, aided by £333 from the Diocesan, and £250 from the Incorporated Society;
A perpetual curacy; patrons, the Dean and Chapter of Lichfield;
A school, purchased from the Independents (Nonconformists), was opened in 1843 which cross-references the gazetteer entry Cannock.

In 1876 Shapurji Edalji was  appointed Vicar of Great Wyrley; he served until his death forty-two years later. A Parsi convert to Christianity from Bombay, he may well have been the first South Asian to become the incumbent of an English parish.

Great Wyrley Outrages
In 1903, the place was the scene of the Great Wyrley Outrages, a series of slashings of horses, cows and sheep. In October, a local solicitor and son of the parson, George Edalji, was tried and convicted for the eighth attack, on a pit pony, and sentenced to seven years with hard labour. Edalji's family had been the victims of a long-running campaign of untraceable abusive letters and anonymous harassment in 1888 and 1892–5. Further letters, in 1903, alleged he was partially responsible for the outrages and caused the police suspicion to focus on him.

Edalji was released in 1906 after the Chief Justice in Bahamas and others had pleaded his case. But he was not pardoned, and the police kept him under surveillance. Sir Arthur Conan Doyle of Sherlock Holmes fame was persuaded to "turn detective" to prove the man's innocence. This he achieved after eight months of work. Edalji was exonerated by a Home Office committee of enquiry, although no compensation was awarded.

Local myth remembers the Outrages to have been enacted by "The Wyrley Gang", although Conan Doyle believed that they were the work of a single person, a local butcher's boy and sometime sailor called Royden Sharp. Ironically, Conan Doyle's suspicion was based on circumstantial evidence. It was an over-reliance on this type of evidence in the first place which had resulted in Edalji's flawed conviction.

Poison pen letters in the name of the "Wyrley Gang" continued for another twenty-five years, but these were subsequently discovered to have been posted from outside the town by Enoch Knowles of Wednesbury, who was arrested and convicted in 1934.

This case has been related or retold:

Conan Doyle's The Story of Mr. George Edalji (1907, expanded re-issue in 1985).
1972 BBC anthology series The Edwardians: Arthur Conan Doyle (one episode) centres on his involvement in the Edaji case. Written by Jeremy Paul and directed by Brian Farnham, it stars Nigel Davenport as Conan Doyle, Sam Dastor as George Edaji, and Renu Setna as the Reverend Edaji.
Arthur & George by Julian Barnes (2005), nominated that year for the Man Booker Prize. In 2010, Arthur & George was adapted for the theatre by David Edgar and, in 2015, for a three-part British television drama of the same title.
A comprehensive non-fictional account Conan Doyle and the Parson's Son: The George Edalji Case by Gordon Weaver (2006).
In Roger Oldfield's book Outrage: The Edalji Five and the Shadow of Sherlock Holmes, Vanguard Press (2010), the case is set within the context of the wider experiences of the Edalji family as a whole. Oldfield  taught history at Great Wyrley High School.

Politics

There are two representatives on Staffordshire County Council, conservatives Kath Perry and Mike Lawrence whose physically large ward is called Cheslyn Hay, Essington and Great Wyrley.  There are five representatives on South Staffordshire District Council:

Great Wyrley has been a safe Conservative seat since at least 1983. It is in the constituency of South Staffordshire and the current MP is Gavin Williamson first elected in 2010. He has increased his majority in every General Election since being first elected.

Localities
Great Wyrley can be divided into two South Staffordshire wards: "Great Wyrley" and "Great Wyrley Landywood," the latter being home to the slightly more southern area of Landywood. However, the settlement of Little Wyrley lies within the parish of Norton Canes — a nearby village.

Great Wyrley lies just under two-and-a-half miles south of Cannock town centre, just under two miles east of Cheslyn Hay, and three-and-a-half miles north of Bloxwich town centre.

Schools
Great Wyrley has three primary schools and one high school:
 Landywood Primary School
 Moat Hall Primary School
 St Thomas More Primary School
 Great Wyrley Academy

Transport
Road
Great Wyrley economically is largely a dormitory for commuters to Birmingham and Wolverhampton, and as a midpoint between Birmingham and Stafford, or Walsall and Cannock more locally; by the parish boundaries are junctions T7 on the M6 Toll motorway and 11 of the M6. 
Rail
Landywood railway station provides services south to Birmingham New Street and north to Rugeley Trent Valley. Wyrley and Cheslyn Hay railway station to the north of Landywood closed in the 1960s (see also: Beeching Report). 
Buses
Great Wyrley is served by four bus routes running between Cannock, Walsall, Wolverhampton, Stafford and Birmingham operated by D&G Bus, National Express WM and Select Bus:

D&G Chaserider route 1 / 1A
D&G Chaserider route 71
National Express West Midlands route X51

Prior to 2008, the area was largely covered by West Midlands Travel and Chase Bus. The area was adopted by Arriva Midlands under the 'Chase Linx' brand which has since become Sapphire. The 71 was adopted by Select following cut backs to Arriva services in 2018. Service 2 was taken over by D&G Bus, operating as Chaserider, on 10 January 2021 following the purchase of Arriva's Cannock depot. Chaserider later replaced route 2 with an extension of Stafford route 74 but reverted back to a standalone Cannock - Walsall route renumbered 1A. Chaserider also took over route 71 from Select Bus, part of the Centrebus group.

Route 2 is based on the old 351 service, and X51 from the 951 service over 10 years ago. This reduced to peak time only but in April 2019 a new timetable launched to run all day between Cannock and Birmingham via Great Wyrley. This prompted the eventual withdrawal of similar Arriva Midlands service 1 in 2020, which was relaunched by predecessor Chaserider in 2021.

Sport

Association football 
Great Wyrley F.C. was a football club based in Great Wyrley between 1980 and 2007

Table tennis 
Great Wyrley Tennis Club is based on Norton Lane, Great Wyrley. Currently the club plays in the Walsall Table Tennis Leagues

Notable people 
 William Brownlow (1830–1901) in 1853 was appointed Curate of Great Wyrley, ultimately Roman Catholic Bishop of Clifton
 John Walker (1900 in Great Wyrley – 1971) an English footballer who played forStoke and Walsall
 Ronnie Allen (1929 – 2001 in Great Wyrley) an English international footballer 1946–1964, making 638 appearances
 Maurice Herriott (born 1939 in Great Wyrley) a British track and field athlete who competed mainly in the 3000 metres steeplechase, competed in the 1964 and 1968 Summer Olympics
 Mike Foster (born 1963) a former Labour Party politician and MP for Worcester 1997–2010, educated at Great Wyrley High School
 Melody Hossaini (born 1984) a social entrepreneur, a professional speaker and personal development trainer and coach, educated at Great Wyrley High School

Listed building
The parish contains one listed building, Landywood Farmhouse, which is designated at Grade II, the lowest of the three grades, which is applied to "buildings of national importance and special interest".  The farmhouse dates from the early 16th century and has a timber framed core on a sandstone plinth and a tile roof.  It was altered and extended in the 19th century, the additions are in red brick and have been roughcast. There are two storeys and an attic, and a T-shaped plan, and the windows are casements with segmental heads.

Nearest settlements

Notes and references
Notes 
  
References

External links

 Conan Doyle and the Parson's Son: The George Edalji Case
 The Parish of Great Wyrley
 Wyrley Wide Web (community site)
 George Edalji
 Great Wyrley Community Band

 
Villages in Staffordshire
Civil parishes in Staffordshire
South Staffordshire District